Responsibility is a novel by New Zealand author Nigel Cox, published by Victoria University Press in 2005.

The novel is set in contemporary Berlin, and tells the story of an expatriate New Zealander who, whilst working as a consultant for German museums, becomes embroiled in criminal activity out of boredom. The novel is notable for combining noir and detective fiction clichés with comedy, as well as having a serious emotional centre.

Much of the book's source material is drawn from Nigel Cox's own experiences living in Berlin, and working at the Jewish Museum there, between 2000 and 2005.

See also

 Nigel Cox
 Dirty Work (New Zealand novel)
 Victoria University Press

References

External links
 

2005 novels
21st-century New Zealand novels
Novels about museums
Novels set in Berlin
Victoria University Press books